Ana Batarelo is a Croatian model who was appointed as Miss Earth Croatia 2014 that gives her the right to represent Croatia in Miss Earth 2014 in November. She is the second Croatian beauty to grace Miss Earth. The last time Croatia sent a delegate to Miss Earth was in 2001.

Biography

Early life and career beginnings
She is a model under FotoModel agency based in Zagreb. But before joining the fashion industry, she joined football and becomes a trained football player.

Miss Earth 2014

According to her interview, Croatia's national director for Miss Earth contacted Batarelo's modelling agency after seeing her private personal Facebook account. Sanja Popovic Bjedov and Tamara Roglić told her about that news and she gladly accepted the responsibility of representing Croatia. Sanja Popovic Bjedov and Tamara Roglić serve as her mentor for her preparation to the pageant. She also thinks that her short hair is her advantage in the competition. She says that a short hair is quite unusual in a pageant scene.

Being designated as her country's representative, Batarelo flew to the Philippines in November to compete with almost 100 other candidates to be Alyz Henrich's successor as Miss Earth.

As a Miss Earth delegate, an environmental advocacy is must. When she was asked about her advocacy for the pageant, she answered, "Clean and clear water." She explained that Croatia has the fourth cleanest waters in world and also because of Adriatic Sea.

When she was asked about what to promote in her country, Croatia, Batarelo answered history of their country is what she can promote together with "...the proud and hospitable people and beautiful landscape."

References

External links
Miss Earth Official Website

Living people
Models from Zagreb
Miss Earth 2014 contestants
Croatian beauty pageant winners
1990 births